Bengt Ryno Berndtsson (26 January 1933 – 4 June 2015) was a Swedish football winger. Born in Gothenburg, he was nicknamed Fölet (meaning The Foal).

After starting his career playing for two local clubs, he joined IFK Göteborg in 1951 and won a Swedish Championship with the club. He played 599 matches for IFK during his 17 seasons there, a club record that would stand for 30 years, before being beaten by Mikael Nilsson.

Berndtsson played for the Sweden national football team, and was a member of the squad at the 1958 FIFA World Cup finals.

References

 Obituary - Expressen

1933 births
2015 deaths
Swedish footballers
IFK Göteborg players
Lundby IF players
Hisingsbacka FC players
1958 FIFA World Cup players
Sweden international footballers
Allsvenskan players
Association football wingers
Footballers from Gothenburg